The Central District of Aghajari County is a district (bakhsh) in Aghajari County, Khuzestan Province, Iran. At the 2011 census, its population was 12,656, in 3,401 families. The district has one city: Aghajari. It is the former Aghajari District of Behbahan County.

References 

Aghajari County
Districts of Khuzestan Province